La Trepadora (English title:Passionate Revenge) is a 2008 Venezuelan telenovela produced by RCTV based on a novel of the same name written by Rómulo Gallegos in 1925.

Norkys Batista and Jean Paul Leroux star as the main protagonists with Emma Rabbe, Aroldo Betancourt and Ana Karina Casanova as the main antagonists.

Plot
Nicolás del Casal is a direct descendant of Cantarrana's previous owners, the hacienda where Hilario, his half-uncle, and his family have been residing. Raised in Europe, he returns to Venezuela to face his past, and he plans to repossess the property which was taken from his father, Louie del Casal. When he arrives in Venezuelan territory, he meets Nicolás Guanipa Victoria, the daughter of Hilario Guanipa, his sworn enemy. Victoria is a strong-willed woman who loves to show the world she was born to lead. She is a naive woman who has grown up all her life in the security of the Cantarrana Hacienda.  Victoria is also the daughter of Hilario Guanipa, the bastard son of Jaime del Casal, who will be the center of Nicolás' revenge. Hilario grew up resenting his half brothers who always made him feel inferior to them and under the social prejudice of being an illegitimate child. Because of this resentment, Hilario became a  ruthless man who fraudulently seized the Cantarrana Hacienda, disregarding the rights of the legitimate heirs. His actions led to the suicide of Louie del Casal, his half-brother, who killed himself after being stripped of what was rightfully his and his family's.

Cast

References

External links
La trepadora at the Internet Movie Database
 at 

2008 telenovelas
RCTV telenovelas
Venezuelan telenovelas
2008 Venezuelan television series debuts
2008 Venezuelan television series endings
Spanish-language telenovelas
Television shows set in Venezuela